The Duomo Nuovo or New Cathedral is the largest Catholic church in Brescia, Italy.

History
Construction was begun in 1604 at the site where the paleo-Christian 5th-6th century basilica of San Pietro de Dom was located. The original commission was given to Andrea Palladio, but it was subsequently granted to the architect Giovanni Battista Lantana. He was aided by Pietro Maria Bagnadore. Work was interrupted during a season of plague around 1630.

Work slowly but sporadically restarted on the construction, but the final impetus for completion came in the nineteenth century. The facade was designed by Giovanni Battista and Antonio Marchetti, while the dome, completed only in 1825, was designed by Luigi Cagnola and with its 80 meters is one of the highest in Italy.

The present dome was rebuilt after destruction during the Second World War. The facade contains statues of the Virgin of the Assumption and Saints Peter, Paul, James, and John.

Among the interior works of art are a scenes from the life of the Virgin by Girolamo Romanino (Marriage, Visitation, and Birth) and a Sacrifice of Isaac by Moretto da Brescia.

The interior contains a monument to the Brescian Pope Paul VI, found on the left transept. The statue (1975) is a work by Raffaele Scorzelli. The Baroque church towers over the small round and rustic Romanesque church of the Old Cathedral of Brescia (Duomo Vecchio).

References

External links

Roman Catholic churches in Brescia
Cathedral of Brescia
Cathedral of Brescia